Scott Saccary (born March 26, 1985 in Halifax, Nova Scotia) is a Canadian curler from Dartmouth, Nova Scotia. He currently plays third for Team Paul Flemming.

Career
Saccary represented Nova Scotia at the Canadian Junior Curling Championships in 2002 and 2003 finishing 5–7 in 2002 and 6–6 in 2003.

Saccary won his first Deloitte Tankard in 2016 with Jamie Murphy. They failed to get out of the pre-qualifying tournament after losing the final to Northwest Territories' Jamie Koe. The team returned the following season after winning the Nova Scotia provincials once again and finished 4–7 in the main event. The team won their third consecutive Deloitte Tankard in 2018 and finished 5–6 at the 2018 Tim Hortons Brier. Also during the 2017–18 season, the team played in the 2017 Canadian Olympic Curling Trials Pre-Trials, losing the tiebreaker to Jason Gunnlaugson.

Team Murphy played in their first Grand Slam of Curling event the following season at the 2018 Masters. At the event, they defeated higher ranked Glenn Howard and Steffen Walstad to qualify for the tiebreakers. They defeated Reid Carruthers in the first round of tiebreakers before losing to Matt Dunstone in the second. They could not defend their title at the 2019 Deloitte Tankard, losing the final to the Stuart Thompson rink.

Team Murphy played in another Grand Slam the following season at the 2019 Tour Challenge Tier 2 event. There, they qualified for the tiebreakers with a 2–2 record. They beat Chad Stevens in the tiebreaker before losing to Michael Fournier in the quarterfinals. The team won the 2020 Deloitte Tankard in mid-January, 2020, and finished 3–4 at the 2020 Tim Hortons Brier.

Due to the COVID-19 pandemic in Nova Scotia, the 2021 provincial championship was cancelled. As the reigning provincial champions, Team Murphy was invited to represent Nova Scotia at the 2021 Tim Hortons Brier, which they accepted. Jamie Murphy opted not to attend the event due to travel restrictions. He was replaced by Scott McDonald of Ontario. At the Brier, they finished with a 4–4 record, failing to qualify for the championship pool.

Personal life
Saccary owns the New Scotland Clothing Co. & New Scotland Brewing Co.. He is married to Gerri d’Entremont.

Teams

References

External links

1985 births
Curlers from Nova Scotia
Living people
Sportspeople from Dartmouth, Nova Scotia
Sportspeople from Halifax, Nova Scotia
Canadian male curlers
21st-century Canadian people